In graph theory and combinatorial optimization, cycle cover may refer to:
Vertex cycle cover
Vertex disjoint cycle cover
Edge cycle cover

Other possible meanings include:
A cover for a bicycle
Vehicle insurance for a bicycle